Khoshk-e Bijar District is a district (bakhsh) in Rasht County, Gilan Province, Iran. At the 2006 census, its population was 28,051, in 8,147 families.  The District has one city: Khoshk-e Bijar.  The District has two rural districts (dehestan): Hajji Bekandeh-ye Koshk-e Bijar Rural District and Nowsher-e Koshk-e Bijar Rural District.

References 

Rasht County
Districts of Gilan Province